KVO may refer to:
 Kiev Military District, a military district of Imperial Russia and the Soviet Union
 Dobel language, spoken by inhabitants of the Aru Islands
 Commander of the Order of Vasa
 "Keep vein open", a medical acronym for an intravenous drip that is flowing just enough to keep the IV open for future use (sometimes written as TKO - "to keep open")
 IATA airport designation for Morava Airport in Kraljevo, Serbia.
 ¨KV Oostende a football team from Ostend (Oostende), Belgium.